Our Lady of the Angels and St Peter in Chains Church or Our Lady and St Peter's Chains Church is a Roman Catholic Parish church in Stoke-on-Trent, Staffordshire. It was built in 1857 and designed by Charles Hansom. It is situated on Hartshill Road close to the junction with Shelton Old Road, south of Queensway, in the centre of the city. It was founded as a church with an adjoining priory of Dominican nuns and is a Grade II listed building.

History

Foundation
In 1838, a Roman Catholic mission from Longton was started in Stoke. In 1841, a chapel, named St Peter's Chains, was built on Back Glebe Street. In 1850, the chapel received its own priest. In early  1851, a group of Dominicans nuns moved into Longton. In 1854, with their lease in Longton ending, they moved to the site of the present church.

Construction
In 1856, building work began on the church and the adjoining convent for the Dominican nuns. To pay for the construction, the old chapel was sold. In 1857, the new church was opened and named Our Lady of the Angels and St Peter in Chains. The convent started a girls' school at the same site. From 1864 to 1865 the adjoining building was expanded to house a boarding school and St Margaret's Home for Incurables. In 1866, the convent was designated a priory.

Extensions
From 1884 to 1885, a new chancel was built. Its architect was A.E. Purdie, who also designed Kilworth House and the chapel at Rudding Park House.

Rev Dr James Northcote was parish priest at the church from 1857 to 1860 and then from 1881 to his death in 1907. In 1865, he also donated a series of Stations of the Cross from Belgium to the church. In 1905, an organ was installed. This was to commemorate the fiftieth anniversary of Northcote's priesthood.

Parish
The church has two Masses: 5:45pm on Saturday and 10:30am on Sunday.

See also
 Roman Catholic Archdiocese of Birmingham

References

External links
 
 Our Lady of the Angels and St Peter in Chains Parish site

Roman Catholic churches in Staffordshire
Buildings and structures in Stoke-on-Trent
Grade II listed churches in Staffordshire
Grade II listed Roman Catholic churches in England
Roman Catholic churches completed in 1857
1857 establishments in England
Gothic Revival church buildings in England
Gothic Revival architecture in Staffordshire